The Special Council of Lower Canada was an appointed body which administered Lower Canada until the Union Act of 1840 created the Province of Canada. Following the Lower Canada Rebellion, on March 27, 1838, the Constitutional Act of 1791 was suspended and both the Legislative Assembly and Legislative Council were dissolved.

The Act of Union united Upper and Lower Canada into a single province with a single parliament, consisting of an upper and lower house. Upon the first meeting of this parliament, the Special Council was dissolved.

In November 1839, the Special Council approved proposals made by Governor Sydenham for the union of the two Canadas.

There were three Special Councils:
 the first, consisting of 24 members, was appointed by the acting Governor General, Sir John Colborne, and served from April 2, 1838 to June 1, 1838, when its members were dismissed by the newly arrived Governor General, Lord Durham within a week of his arrival in Canada.
 the second, appointed by Lord Durham, existed from June 28, 1838 to November 2, 1838. This council was much smaller than the first had been, with an initial membership of five (later expanded to seven). All the members of Durham's Council were British officials who had arrived in Canada as part of his entourage.
 the third, appointed by Sir John Colborne, existed from November 2, 1838 to February 10, 1841. This consisted of the same members who had been appointed in April. Lord Sydenham, who assumed office as Governor General in 1839, added twelve new members in three rounds of appointments in 1839 and 1840. None of the members of Durham's second Council served on the third Council.

Lists of Members of the Special Council

Presiding Officer

The presiding member of the Special Council acted as Speaker.

 James Cuthbert Jr. 1838
 Sir James Stuart, 1st Baronet 1839-1841

Meeting Venue

In 1838 the Council met at Government House in Montreal and also at Quebec City. From 1839 to 1841 the Council met in Montreal only.

See also 
Constitutional history of Canada

Notes

External links 
  Assemblée nationale du Québec (French)

Political history of Quebec
Lower Canada
1838 establishments in Lower Canada
1841 disestablishments

Lower Canada